Emanuel Driggus (b. c. 1620s-d. 1673) and his wife Frances were Atlantic Creole slaves in the mid-seventeenth century in Virginia, of the Chesapeake Bay Colony. The name Driggus is likely a corruption of the Portuguese name Rodrigues as he was born in the Portuguese colony of Ndongo (as were others among the First Africans in Virginia, such as John Graweere and Angela).

The two first appear in a record of sale in 1640 to Captain Francis Potts; at the time they arranged for a contract of limited indenture for their two children in service. The Driggus couple had other children, who were born into slavery. In 1657, Captain Potts sold two of their children, Thomas and Ann Driggus, to pay off some personal debt.

Driggus was freed after the death of Potts in 1658. By then he was a widower and had remarried, but he continued to provide for the enslaved children from his first marriage. He bequeathed a horse to his daughters Francy and Jane before his death in 1673.  
 
His son Thomas Driggus eventually married a free black woman; because she was free, their children were born free.  According to the principle of partus sequitur ventrem, adopted into Virginia law in 1662, children born in the colony took the status of their mother. This principle, which contributed to the expansion of chattel slavery, was widely adopted by other colonies and incorporated into state laws after the American Revolutionary War.

References

Further reading
 Douglas Deal, Race and Class in Colonial Virginia, (Garland, 1993)

17th-century American slaves
Free Negroes
Virginia colonial people
Angolan-American history